Abdullah Darkhawasti (1887–1994) was a Pakistani Sunni Islamic scholar and former Amir of the Jamiat Ulema-e-Islam. He co-founded Markazi Jamiatul Ulama-e-Islam along with Mufti Mahmud, Ahmad Ali Lahori and others in 1956.

Biography
Darkhwasti was born in Muharram 1313 AH in Rahim Yar Khan. He studied his primary classes under his father and later became a student of Ghulam Muhammad Deenpuri, a disciple of Hafiz Muhammad Siddique. Anwar Shah Kashmiri gave him the title of Hafiz al-Hadees. 
Darkhwasti died on 28 August 1994. His last rites were performed on the next day and was buried nearby Ubaidullah Sindhi.

He played a key role in getting Qadiyanis declared as non Muslims in Pakistan.

References

1994 deaths
1887 births
Pakistani Sunni Muslim scholars of Islam
Jamiat Ulema-e-Islam politicians
People from Rahim Yar Khan District